Quercus elevaticostata is an uncommon species of tree in the beech family. It has been found only in southern China, in the province of Fujian. It is placed in subgenus Cerris, section Cyclobalanopsis.

Quercus elevaticostata is a tree up to 20 meters tall with purple-brown twigs plus leaves as much as 15 cm long.

References

elevaticostata
Flora of Fujian
Plants described in 1979